Christian Rasmussen (born 29 June 2000) is a Danish race car driver from Copenhagen. He currently competes in Indy Lights driving the No. 6 for HMD Motorsports with Dale Coyne Racing.

Racing record

Career summary

* Season still in progress

Motorsports career results

American open–wheel racing results

U.S. F2000 National Championship

Indy Pro 2000 Championship

Indy Lights/Indy NXT
(key) (Races in bold indicate pole position) (Races in italics indicate fastest lap) (Races with L indicate a race lap led) (Races with * indicate most race laps led)

Complete WeatherTech SportsCar Championship results 
(key)(Races in bold indicate pole position. Races in italics indicate fastest race lap in class. Results are overall/class)

* Season still in progress

References

External links
  
 

2000 births
Living people
Danish racing drivers
U.S. F2000 National Championship drivers
Indy Pro 2000 Championship drivers
Indy Lights drivers
Sportspeople from Copenhagen
Andretti Autosport drivers
WeatherTech SportsCar Championship drivers
Dale Coyne Racing drivers
United States F4 Championship drivers
Danish F4 Championship drivers
HMD Motorsports drivers